Ronald John Crawford  (26 March 1936 – 8 August 2018) was an Australian racewalker who competed in the 1956 Summer Olympics, in the 1960 Summer Olympics, and in the 1964 Summer Olympics.

References

1936 births
2018 deaths
Australian male racewalkers
Olympic athletes of Australia
Athletes (track and field) at the 1956 Summer Olympics
Athletes (track and field) at the 1960 Summer Olympics
Athletes (track and field) at the 1964 Summer Olympics
Recipients of the Medal of the Order of Australia
Recipients of the Australian Sports Medal